Finding It Hard to Smile (stylized in all lowercase) is the debut studio album by American indie pop band Lovelytheband, released on August 3, 2018. The album was announced on June 29, 2018, along with the release of the track "Alone Time".

Prior to its release, the band had gained a reputation through their opening performances for several bands, including Awolnation and 5 Seconds of Summer. After said tours, they ventured on a festival tour throughout the summer of 2018. The album was promoted with two singles: "Broken" and "These Are My Friends", as well as two promotional singles: "Alone Time" and "Pity Party".

The tracklist includes the songs released on the band's debut EP, Everything I Could Never Say..., excluding "Strangers" and "Don't Worry, You Will".

Track listing
Credits adapted from Tidal.

All tracks are stylized in lowercase letters.

Charts
Chart performance for Finding It Hard To Smile

References

2018 debut albums
Lovelytheband albums
Another Century Records albums